is a district of Mihama Ward, Chiba City, Chiba Prefecture, Japan, consisting of 1-chōme to 6-chōme. The district entirely consists of reclaimed land from Tokyo Bay. In 1-chōme to 4-chōme the newer Jūkyo-hyōji (住居表示) style is adopted, while in 5-chōme and 6-chōme the older chiban (地番) style is adopted.

History

Geography
The district is located on the western part of Mihama Ward.

Surrounding districts
Mihama Ward, Chiba City
 Hamada

Hanamigawa Ward, Chiba City
 Makuharicho
 Makuharihongo

Narashino City
 Kasumi
 Sodegaura

Demographics
The population as of March 2018 is shown below.

Transportation
 Keiyo Road Makuhari IC

Bus service
 Keisei Bus
 Makuhari-nishi 2-chome - Makuhari-nishi 3rd Park
 Makuhari-nishi 2-chome - Makuhari-nishi Junior High School - Makuhari-nishi 2nd Park
 Makuhari-nishi 2-chome - Makuhari-nishi Junior High School - Makuhari Kopo-mae - Makuhari-nishi 5-chome - Makuhari-nishi 6-chome

Education
 Chiba City Makuhari-nishi Junior High School
 Chiba City Makuhari-nishi Elementary School

See also
 Makuhari

References

Chiba (city)